Fairmont Municipal Airport  is a city-owned public-use airport located two nautical miles (3.7 km) southeast of the central business district of Fairmont, a city in Martin County, Minnesota, United States.

The airport at this location was dedicated in 1951.

Facilities and aircraft 
It has two asphalt paved runways: 13/31 is 5,505 by 100 feet (1,678 x 30 m) and 2/20 is 3,300 by 75 feet (1,006 x 23 m).

For the 12-month period ending May 30, 2008, the airport had 9,400 aircraft operations, an average of 25 per day: 91% general aviation, 7% air taxi and 1% military. At that time there were 30 aircraft based at this airport: 83% single-engine, 
10% multi-engine, 3% jet and 3% ultralight.

History 
In 1959 North Central Airlines began scheduled service using Douglas DC-3 aircraft. The flight route was from Minneapolis–St. Paul International Airport, Mankato, Fairmount, Worthington, and Sioux Falls, SD.  Scheduled service by various commuter airlines continued until 1996.

References

External links 
 

Airports in Minnesota
Buildings and structures in Martin County, Minnesota
Transportation in Martin County, Minnesota
Former Essential Air Service airports